The Museum of Contemporary Art Chengdu (abbreviated MoCA) in Chengdu, China is a Chinese museum solely dedicated to exhibiting, interpreting, and collecting contemporary art, both from across China and around the world. MoCA is located at the Chengdu Tianfu Software Park.

History
The museum, designed by the architect Liu Jiakun, was opened in 2011. Construction of the museum was funded by Chengdu High-Tech Zone Investment Co. Ltd., a state-owned company.

The art historian, critic and curator Lü Peng became the museum's first director. Lü Peng is known for his publications History of Chinese Contemporary Art: 1990–1999 and A History of Art In Twentieth Century China.

In 2014, the museum did not yet have a display of its permanent collection, but had opened its gallery for exhibits of modern art and photography.

In addition to hosting exhibitions from Asian artists the museum has hosted retrospective surveys of western artists including: Tony Cragg, Michael Pinsky and Picasso and have collaborated with institutions such as the Musée d'Art Moderne de la Ville de Paris to show the works of Dominique Gonzalez–Foerster, Douglas Gordon, Pierre Huyghe, Ange Leccia and Philippe Parreno

See also
 Chengdu Museum of Contemporary Art (a different museum)

References

External links
Museum of Contemporary Art official website on Archive.org

2011 establishments in China
Art museums established in 2011
Contemporary art galleries in China
Museums in Chengdu
Arts in Chengdu